Sinilabeo longibarbatus is a species of cyprinid of the genus Sinilabeo. It inhabits China and is considered harmless to humans. It has not been evaluated on the IUCN Red List.

References

Cyprinid fish of Asia
Freshwater fish of China
Fish described in 1988